The thirteenth election to Cardiganshire County Council took place in March 1931. It was preceded by the 1928 election and followed by the 1934 election.

Candidates
32 of the 50 councillors were returned unopposed with a further three sets being won unopposed by new candidates. This resulted in fifteen contests, five more than three years previously Political affiliations did not feature in the election.

Among the retiring members, Henry Bonsall stood down at Llanbadarn Fawr. He first represented Bow Street from 1892 until 1904 and subsequently serving as member for Llanbadarn for nearly twenty years.

Retiring aldermen

Eight aldermen retired, but only Meredith Gwarnant Williams (Llanwenog) stood as a candidate in the election.

Gains and losses

Very few seats changed hands.

Contested elections

Of the fifteen contests, ten featured retiring members, eight of whom were successful. Seats were largely not fought on political lines.

Outcome

Very little change took place as a result of an election in which only one sitting member lost his seat.

Results

Aberaeron

Aberbanc

Aberporth

Aberystwyth Division 1

Aberystwyth Division 2

Aberystwyth Division 3

Aberystwyth Division 4

Aberystwyth Division 5

Aberystwyth Division 6

Aeron
}

Borth

Bow Street

Cardigan North

Cardigan South

Cilcennin

Cwmrheidol

Devil's Bridge

Felinfach

Goginan

Lampeter Borough

Llanarth

Llanbadarn Fawr

Llanddewi Brefi

Llandygwydd

Llandysul North

Llandysul South

Llansysiliogogo

Llanfair Clydogau

Llanfarian

Llanfihangel y Creuddyn

Llangoedmor

Llangeitho

Llangrannog

Llanilar

Llanrhystyd

Llanllwchaiarn

Llansantffraed

Llanwnen

Llanwenog

Lledrod

Nantcwnlle

New Quay

Penbryn

Strata Florida

Taliesin

Talybont

Trefeurig

Tregaron

Troedyraur

Ysbyty Ystwyth

Election of Aldermen
Eight aldermen were elected, with four being re-appointed, including R.J.R. Loxdale of Llanilar, who contested the seat for the first time since 1913. The long-serving member, D.C. Roberts, Aberystwyth, had not faced the electorate at the most recent election although he had stood regularly at previous elections. Four members who had been returned at the recent election were appointed, including E.J. Davies who had previously served as alderman from 1913 until 1919. W.E. Matthews had been elected to fill a vacancy some years earlier. 

D.C. Roberts, Aberystwyth
R.J.R. Loxdale, Llanilar
J.G. Morris Davies, Devil's Bridge
E.J. Davies, New Quay
J. Elias Jones, Llandysiliogogo
W.E. Matthews, Cardigan
J.W. Lewis, Llangrannog
R.D. Herbert, Lledrod

By-elections
Four by-elections were held following the election of aldermen. At Lledrod, Owen James Owen of Taihirion, Blaenpennal was returned unopposed. Dr Evan Jones, who had unsuccessfully stood against Meredith Gwarnant Williams at Llanwenog, was returned unopposed at the by-election. Three wards were contested but no party allegiances were declared.

Llandysiliogogo by-election

Llangrannog by-election

Lledrod by-election

New Quay by-election

References

1931
1931 Welsh local elections
20th century in Ceredigion